Blanda is a river in Iceland.

Blanda may refer to:

Blanda (city), an ancient city in Lucania, Italy
George Blanda (1927–2010), American football player

Blanda may also refer to:
Blanes (Latin: Blanda), a city in Girona, Spain